The Lycée français d'Alep, known also as MLF lycée d'Alep, École française or the French school, is a French lycée in the city of Aleppo, Syria, founded in 1997 by the Mission laïque française, an organization which also helped found other lycées worldwide.

It is a large educational complex consisting of several buildings and sports facilities. The Lycée français d'Alep, along with the Lycée Charles de Gaulle in Damas (opened in 2008) are the only French schools in Syria which are accredited by the French Ministry of National Education.

History

The school closed in 2012 and the campus was destroyed as a result of the Syrian Civil War. In 2014 the school had a partial reopening in a private residence, with students taking CNED correspondence classes. At the time 8 students were French.

Programme
As a French accredited institution, the school follows the official teaching programmes of the French Republic. The school offers a complete education programme of 15 years which starts with a preliminary 3 years of kindergarten classes and ends by achieving a French baccalaureate degree with two options: "Economic & Social (ES)" and "Scientific (S)". The baccalaureate allows graduates to continue their studying in French universities all over the world as well as some other American, Canadian, European and Middle Eastern universities.

See also
International School of Aleppo
Mission laïque française

References

External links
 Official website (French & Arabic) (Archive)

French international schools in Syria
Schools in Aleppo
Educational institutions established in 1997
1997 establishments in Syria